Anderson East Township is a township in McDonald County, in the U.S. state of Missouri.

Anderson East Township takes its name from the town of Anderson, Missouri.

References

Townships in Missouri
Townships in McDonald County, Missouri